Calliprora is a genus of moths in the family Gelechiidae.

Species
 Calliprora centrocrossa Meyrick, 1922
 Calliprora clistogramma Meyrick, 1926
 Calliprora erethistis Meyrick, 1922
 Calliprora eurydelta Meyrick, 1922
 Calliprora pentagramma Meyrick, 1914
 Calliprora peritura Meyrick, 1922
 Calliprora platyxipha Meyrick, 1922
 Calliprora rhodogramma Meyrick, 1922
 Calliprora sexstrigella (Chambers, 1874)
 Calliprora tetraplecta Meyrick, 1922
 Calliprora trigramma Meyrick, 1914

References

 
Gelechiini